Phasianotrochus hirasei is a species of sea snail, a marine gastropod mollusk in the family Trochidae, the top snails.

WoRMS mentions this species as a taxon inquirendum Cantharidus hirasei Pilsbry, 1901

Description
The height of the shell attains 15 mm. The ovate-pyramidal shell is solid. The color of the shell is a uniform olive or a brownish-olive, belted with numerous reddish spiral bands. The shell is smooth except for faint growth lines above. The base of the shell scores by 5 or 6 narrow, spaced, concentric grooves that become stronger near the axis. The conic spire contains 6½ convex whorls. The body whorl is subangular at the periphery  and convex beneath. The oblique aperture is brilliantly green inside, with a dusky submarginal band and a pale edge. The white columella is opaque and rounded. The umbilical region is imperforate or has a very minute perforation.

This is the only species of Phasianotrochus outside Australia.

Distribution

References

External links
 Pilsbry, H.A. 1901. New Mollusca from Japan, the Loo Choo Islands, Formosa and the Philippines. Proceedings of the Academy of Natural Sciences of Philadelphia 53: 193-210.page(s): 199
 

hirasei
Gastropods described in 1901